The Royal Challengers Bangalore are an Indian women's cricket team that compete in the Women's Premier League (WPL), based in Bengaluru. The team is owned by Diageo, who also own the men's team. The team is coached by Ben Sawyer, and their squad was assembled at the inaugural WPL player auction in February 2023.

History
In October 2022, the BCCI announced its intentions to hold a five-team women's franchise cricket tournament in March 2023. The tournament was named the Women's Premier League in January 2023, with investors buying the rights to franchises through a closed bidding process during the same month. Diageo, the owners of Royal Challengers Bangalore in the Indian Premier League, bought the rights to one of the franchises.

In February 2023, Ben Sawyer was announced as head coach of the side. The inaugural player auction for the WPL was held on 13 February 2023, with Royal Challengers Bangalore signing 18 players for their squad. On 18 February 2023, Smriti Mandhana was announced as the team's captain for the inaugural season.

Current squad
As per 2023 season. Players in bold have international caps.

Administration and support staff

Source: Official website

Kit manufacturers and sponsors

See also
 Sports in Karnataka

References

Royal Challengers Bangalore
Cricket clubs established in 2023
Women's Premier League (cricket) teams
United Breweries Group